Bansley is a surname. Notable people with the surname include:

 Charles Bansley (fl. 1548), English poet
 Heather Bansley (born 1987), Canadian beach volleyball player

See also
 Barnsley (surname)
 Barsley